Natascha Badmann (born 6 December 1966) is a professional triathlete from Switzerland. She is a 6-time winner of the Ironman World Championships in Kailua-Kona, Hawaii in 1998, 2000, 2001, 2002, 2004, and 2005 ; in 1998 she became the first European woman to win the Ironman Triathlon World Championship.

Natascha works in Switzerland as a social worker, and speaks German, English, French, and Italian. She currently lives in Winznau, Switzerland with her husband Toni and daughter Anastasia.

Her daughter Anastasia was born days before she turned 18. Nicknamed the "Swiss Miss", Badmann won her first Ironman World Championship at the age of 29, when her daughter was already 13 years old. Her husband, coach and nutritionist is Toni Hasler.

At the 2007 Hawaii Ironman, Badmann hit a cone on the bike leg and injured her shoulder and collarbone. While she wanted to continue the race, Hasler convinced her to drop out to prevent further injury. At the same race in 2006, stomach problems nearly caused her to drop out again. Early into the run, Badmann stopped and threw up. Struggling to continue, she began to walk. In a dramatic moment with tremendous support from cheering fans, Badmann, crying, began jogging. She finished 10th with a personal-worst marathon time of 3:27:54.

Though she finished second on the course of the 2004 Ironman Triathlon World Championship, Badmann is considered the winner of the race due to the disqualification of the initial winner, Germany's Nina Kraft, after Kraft admitted to using the banned performance enhancer EPO.

Ranking list
Table below gives major significative ranking podium) obtained from International Championship triathlon since 1994.

Notes

External links
 Official website
 Profile
 Triresults - Ironman Hawaii World Champions

1966 births
Ironman world champions
Living people
Sportspeople from Basel-Stadt
Swiss female triathletes
Duathletes